Reflections is the debut extended play by American indie pop band MisterWives, released digitally on January 7, 2014 via Photo Finish Records. It peaked at #84 on the Billboard 200. All tracks except "Twisted Tongue" and "Kings and Queens" would later appear on the band's debut full-length album Our Own House.

Two singles were released from the album: "Reflections" and "Vagabond". "Reflections" was the highest-charting single from the album, peaking at #13 on the Billboard rock chart in 2014.

Critical reception
Reflections received critical acclaim, with several people comparing the album's sound to the work of The Lumineers. Nick Nelson of The Concordian rated it 5 out of 5 stars and proclaimed that the band had started an "alternative revolution"; while Timothy Monger of AllMusic stated that the album was "a shimmering blend of [...] upbeat pop". Alyson Stokes of idobi Radio rated the album 8 out of 10 stars and suggested that listeners could listen to the album's tracks without growing tired of them; as well as calling the band itself "genreless".

Track listing

Chart positions

References

External links
 

2014 debut EPs
Albums produced by Frequency (record producer)
MisterWives albums
Photo Finish Records albums